The Doubles competition at the 2017 World Championships was held on 28 January 2017.

Results
The first run as started at 13:33 and the second run at 15:20.

References

Doubles